NGC 181 is a galaxy, likely a spiral galaxy located in the constellation Andromeda. It was discovered on October 6, 1883 by Édouard Stephan.

References

External links
 

0181
Spiral galaxies
Andromeda (constellation)
Discoveries by Édouard Stephan
002287